The Crimson Circle is a 1929 British-German crime film directed by Frederic Zelnik and starring Lya Mara, Fred Louis Lerch, and Stewart Rome.

The film, a co-production between British International Pictures and Efzet Film, was made in both a silent version and a sound version filmed in the Phonofilm sound-on-film system. In March 1929, this film and The Clue of the New Pin, filmed in the British Phototone sound-on-disc process, were previewed in London.

The film is an adaptation of the 1922 Edgar Wallace novel The Crimson Circle in which Scotland Yard detectives battle a gang of blackmailers. A previous UK version was filmed in 1922.

Plot
Police battle against a gang of blackmailers known as The Crimson Circle.

Cast

References

External links

The Crimson Circle (1929) at SilentEra

1929 films
1929 crime films
British crime films
German crime films
Films of the Weimar Republic
1920s German-language films
Films directed by Frederic Zelnik
Films based on British novels
Films based on works by Edgar Wallace
Transitional sound films
British black-and-white films
German black-and-white films
1920s British films
1920s German films